Zhangjiajie Glass footpath is a skywalk bridge in Zhangjiajie, Hunan, above the Wulingyuan area. The bridge, built as an attraction for tourists, is glass-bottomed and is transparent. When it opened it was the longest and tallest glass bottomed bridge in the world. The bridge spans the canyon between two mountain cliffs in Zhangjiajie National Forest Park in the northwest of Hunan province. It is designed to carry up to 800 visitors at a time. The bridge was designed by Israeli architect Haim Dotan.

To build the bridge, engineers erected four support pillars on the edges of the walls of the canyon. The bridge is made of a metal frame with more than 120 glass panels. Each of these panels is three-layered and is a  slab of tempered glass. There are three long swings attached to the underside of the bridge. There is also a provision for making a  bungee jump, considered to be highest bungee jump in the world.

According to the Management Committee of the Bridge, the bridge has set ten world records spanning its design and construction. The record as longest glass bridge has since passed to a glass bridge in the Hongyagu Scenic Area, Hebei.

Closures
On September 2, 2016, just 13 days after the bridge was opened, the authorities put out a notice saying that they were closing the bridge due to overwhelming visitor traffic.  The bridge, designed to hold 800 people at a time and expected to be visited by about 8,000 people per day, had reportedly attracted more than 80,000 visitors per day. The authorities said that the government decided to suspend operations due to the "urgency to improve and update" the attraction, including its car parks, ticket-booking system, and customer service. The bridge reopened on September 30, 2016.

Gallery

See also 
 East Taihang Glasswalk

References

Bridges in Hunan
Tourist attractions in Zhangjiajie
Bridges completed in 2016
Glass-bottomed bridges